Ambrysus circumcinctus is a species of creeping water bug in the family Naucoridae. It is found in Central America and North America.

References

Further reading

 

Articles created by Qbugbot
Insects described in 1910
Naucoridae